The Tržič Bistrica is a river in Upper Carniola, Slovenia. It starts in the Karawanks, runs through the Dovžan Gorge and the town of Tržič, and joins the Sava near Podbrezje.

References

External links

Condition of Tržič Bistrica - graphs, in the following order, of water level, flow and temperature data for the past 30 days (taken near Tržič by ARSO)

Rivers of Upper Carniola